Roberto Hernández may refer to:

Sports
Roberto Hernandez Jr. (1938–2017), Mexican sportscaster
Roberto Hernández (sprinter) (1967–2021), Cuban athlete
Roberto Hernández (relief pitcher) (born 1964), Puerto Rican baseball player
Roberto Hernández (starting pitcher) (born 1980), Dominican baseball player, formerly known as Fausto Carmona
Roberto Hernández (footballer) (born 1967), Mexican footballer
Roberto Hernández (manager) (born 1964), Chilean football manager
Roberto Hernández (archer) (born 1989), El Salvadoran archer

Others
Roberto Hernández Ramírez (born 1942), Mexican businessman
Roberto Hernández Vélez, Puerto Rican politician and former mayor of Corozal
Roberto Hernández (filmmaker), Mexican filmmaker and lawyer, director of the 2009 documentary Presumed Guilty
Roberto Aguilar Hernández (born 1964), Mexican politician